Snake Bitten is a book written by Kevin Markwell and Nancy Cushing.  The book, with interviews from staff and supporters, is a biography of Eric Worrell who established the Australian Reptile Park in 1959.

Sources

2010 non-fiction books
Books about Australian natural history
Australian non-fiction books
Books about scientists